Irina Sazonova (born ) is a Russian-born Icelandic female artistic gymnast, currently representing Iceland at international competitions. Prior to her move to Iceland, she represented Russia at the 2011 Summer Universiade. She represented Iceland at the 2015 Northern European and World Championships and became the first female Icelandic gymnast at the Olympics, competing in Rio de Janeiro in 2016. She currently resides in Reykjavik and trains at Fimleikadeild Armanns.

As a Russian athlete, she competed at the 2009 Russian Artistic Gymnastics Championships, 2010 Russian Artistic Gymnastics Championships and 2011 Summer Universiade. Representing Iceland, she competed at the 2015 World Artistic Gymnastics Championships in Glasgow. She became the first Icelandic female to book an Olympic spot in the apparatus and all-around events at the Olympic Test Event in Rio de Janeiro.

Career

Russia
Sazonova made her international debut as a junior, competing at the 2005 WOGA Classic in Texas. She won bronze on vault, and placed fifth in the all-around and floor exercise, sixth on uneven bars, and thirteenth on balance beam. As a senior, she competed at the Russian Championships in 2010, winning team bronze, and placing fifth on floor and thirteenth in the all-around. She was sent to compete at the Cottbus World Cup the following year, but did not make the event finals. Later that year, she competed at the Universiade, winning team bronze, and placing sixth on uneven bars and seventh in the all-around.

Iceland
Sazonova made the move to Iceland in 2014, with her change in nationality and international representation becoming official later that year. Her first international competition representing Iceland was the Voronin Cup in her native Russia, but she did not make the event finals. The following year, she competed at the Northern European Championships, winning uneven bars gold, floor exercise bronze, and placing fourth in the all-around. She also competed at the World Championships in Glasgow, Scotland, but did not make the event finals. At the Voronin Cup at the end of the year, she placed sixth in the all-around and uneven bars and eighth on balance beam.

In April 2016, she competed at the Olympic Test Event. She placed thirty-ninth in the all-around, qualifying as an individual for the Olympics. She later competed at the Nordic Championships, winning team and uneven bars gold, vault silver, and placing fifth in the all-around. In June, she competed at the European Championships in Switzerland, but did not make the event finals.

Rio Olympics
Sazonova competed in the fourth subdivision of qualifications, starting on vault. She placed fortieth in the all-around, fifty-eighth on uneven bars, sixtieth on floor exercise, and sixty-fourth on balance beam.

Following Rio, she placed sixth on uneven bars and seventh on vault at the Cottbus World Cup in November. In December, she competed at the Voronin Cup, winning silver on vault, bronze on bars and beam, and placing fourth in the all-around and sixth with her team and on floor.

Competitive history

References

1991 births
Living people
Icelandic female artistic gymnasts
Russian female artistic gymnasts
Gymnasts at the 2016 Summer Olympics
Olympic gymnasts of Iceland
Universiade medalists in gymnastics
People from Vologda
Universiade bronze medalists for Russia
Medalists at the 2011 Summer Universiade
Russian emigrants to Iceland
Sportspeople from Vologda Oblast